Diego Rubio Hernández (born 13 June 1991) is a Spanish cyclist, who currently rides for UCI ProTeam . He was named in the startlist for the 2017 Vuelta a España.

Major results

2012
 4th Overall Tour d'Azerbaïdjan
1st Stage 2
2015
 2nd Overall Vuelta a la Comunidad de Madrid
2016
 6th Overall Tour du Limousin
1st  Young rider classification
2017
 4th Vuelta a La Rioja
  Combativity award Stage 4 Vuelta a España
2018
 5th Overall Vuelta a Castilla y León
 7th Prueba Villafranca de Ordizia
2019
 1st  Mountains classification Volta a la Comunitat Valenciana
 4th Road race, National Road Championships
 7th Overall Vuelta a Aragón
  Combativity award Stage 14 Vuelta a España
2020
 2nd Trofeo Matteotti
2021
 5th Overall Boucles de la Mayenne
  Combativity award Stage 2 Vuelta a España

Grand Tour general classification results timeline

References

External links

1991 births
Living people
Spanish male cyclists
Sportspeople from the Province of Ávila
Cyclists from Castile and León